Ernest Lancelot Grimstone (1883 – 22 October 1933) was an Australian politician. He was a Country and Progressive National Party member of the Queensland Legislative Assembly from 1928 until 1933, representing the electorate of Stanley.

Grimstone was born and educated in Mackay. He worked for the North Eton Sugar Milling Company after leaving school, but became a career teacher with the Queensland Department of Education after 1904. He taught at Ulam, near Rockhampton, Windorah West, Forsayth and Springsure, before being appointed headmaster at Yarraman Creek State School. While teaching on the Darling Downs, he also farmed experimental lots, mainly dealing in wheat and corn.

Grimstone enlisted during World War I, trained at the Royal Military College, Duntroon, and was commissioned as a lieutenant. He subsequently served with the 9th Battalion in France from May to November 1918. Following the end of the war, he returned to Yarraman. He was involved in the local community in the years after the war, serving as chairman of the local ambulance committee and as vice-president of the local branch of the Royal Automobile Club of Queensland.

He was elected to the Legislative Assembly at a 1928 by-election, following the death of incumbent Stanley MP Frederick Lancelot Nott, defeating former MP and independent candidate Henry Plantagenet Somerset by 520 votes. He was re-elected by a much larger margin at the 1929 election without Somerset on the ballot. When the CPNP won the 1932 election under Arthur Edward Moore, he was appointed to the panel of temporary Chairman of Committees and as assistant secretary of the Country Party section of government members. The Courier-Mail reported that Grimstone was a "popular member on both sides of the House" and that "his tolerance and his broadmindedness won him popularity".

Grimstone suffered a seizure at Toogoolawah in 1933, from which he never fully recovered. He suffered a further seizure while on a visit to Esk in October, and died at the Esk Hospital on 22 October without regaining consciousness. Labor leader William Forgan Smith expressed shock at Grimstone's sudden death, as it was reported that his health had been improving. He was buried at Toowong Cemetery. The resulting by-election was easily won by CPNP candidate Roy Bell in the absence of a Labor candidate.

References

1883 births
1933 deaths
Members of the Queensland Legislative Assembly
Burials at Toowong Cemetery
People from Mackay, Queensland
Royal Military College, Duntroon graduates
20th-century Australian politicians